How to Behave is a short film released through MGM Studios starring Robert Benchley.  The short, released in 1936, spoofs social etiquette films and norms of the time.

References
 Billy Altman, Laughter's Gentle Soul: The Life of Robert Benchley. (New York City: W. W. Norton, 1997. ).

External links

1936 films
1936 comedy films
American black-and-white films
Films directed by Arthur Ripley
Metro-Goldwyn-Mayer short films
1936 short films
American comedy short films
1930s English-language films
1930s American films